The Gift is the debut solo studio album by Scottish musician Midge Ure, released on 7 October 1985 by Chrysalis Records. It was released while his band Ultravox were taking a break; the band would go on to release U-Vox (1986) before breaking up. The album reached No. 2 in the UK Albums Chart partly due to the large attention drawn to it by the single "If I Was" which reached No. 1 in the UK Singles Chart in September 1985. "That Certain Smile" was released as the second single in November 1985, and "Wastelands" was released as the third single in January 1986.

Background
Daniel Mitchell and Ure wrote "Wastelands" together for the band Modern Man. They started a songwriting partnership that has produced 5 songs on "The Gift", including a reworking of "Wastelands", which was originally from the Midge Ure-produced Modern Man album Concrete Scheme released 1980.

"The Gift" features 3 instrumental tracks, which was recorded on the Caribbean island of Montserrat using a Casio CZ-101. Ure said in 1985: 

Ure said in 1989:

On "Edo" Ure plays on a koto he bought in Japan the first time Ultravox toured there.

The song "The Gift" was dedicated to the 19th-century Scottish architect Charles Rennie Mackintosh.

Track listing
"If I Was" (Midge Ure, Daniel Mitchell) – 5:22
"When the Winds Blow" (Ure, Mitchell) – 4:07
"Living in the Past" (Ian Anderson) – 4:35
"That Certain Smile" (Ure, Mitchell) – 4:08
"The Gift" (Ure) – 5:00
"Antilles" (Instrumental) (Ure) – 4:08
"Wastelands" (Ure, Mitchell) – 4:40
"Edo" (Instrumental) (Ure) – 3:24
"The Chieftain" (Instrumental) (Ure) – 4:45
"She Cried" (Ure, Mitchell) – 4:12
"The Gift (Reprise)" (Ure) – 1:45

Bonus tracks for 1996 UK re-release:
"Mood Music" – 3:30
"Piano" (Ure) – 2:28
"The Man Who Sold the World" (David Bowie) – 5:37
"The Gift (Instrumental)" (Ure) – 5:11

Bonus disk for 2010 Remastered Definitive Edition:
"No Regrets"
"Mood Music"
"If I Was" [Extended Mix]
"Piano"
"The Man Who Sold the World"
"That Certain Smile" [Extended Mix]
"The Gift" [Instrumental]
"Fade to Grey" (Recorded live at Rehearsals 27 Sep 1985. Feat. Mick Ronson on guitar)
"Wastelands" [Extended Mix]
"When the Winds Blow" (Recorded live at Wembley Arena, 23 Dec 1985)
"After a Fashion" (Recorded live at Wembley Arena, 23 Dec 1985)
"The Chieftain / The Dancer" (Recorded live at Wembley Arena, 23 Dec 1985)
"Call of the Wild" [Extended Mix]
"That Certain Smile" (Recorded live at Wembley Arena, 23 Dec 1985)
"The Gift" (Recorded live at Wembley Arena, 23 Dec 1985)

Personnel
Midge Ure – vocals, instrumentation, production
Mark King – bass guitar (tracks 1, 3, 9)
Mae McKenna, Lorenza Johnson, Jackie Challenor – backing vocals (tracks 4, 7)
Mark Brzezicki – drums (track 7)
Nigel Ross-Scott – bass guitar (tracks 4, 10)
Lindsay Elliott – drums (track 4)
Glenn Gregory – backing vocals (track 6)
Paul Mosby – mizmar (track 10)

Technical
Brian Tench – mixing engineer
Rik Walton – recording engineer
John Hudson – co-producer (track 12)
George Hurrell – photography
Peter Saville Associates – design

Charts

References

Liner notes

External links

1985 debut albums
Midge Ure albums
Albums produced by Midge Ure
Chrysalis Records albums